THe enzyme 3,4-dihydroxyphthalate decarboxylase catalyzes the chemical reaction

3,4-dihydroxyphthalate  3,4-dihydroxybenzoate + CO2

This enzyme belongs to the family of lyases, specifically the carboxy-lyases, which cleave carbon-carbon bonds.  The systematic name of this enzyme class is 3,4-dihydroxyphthalate carboxy-lyase (3,4-dihydroxybenzoate-forming). This enzyme is also called 3,4-dihydroxyphthalate carboxy-lyase.

References

 

EC 4.1.1
Enzymes of unknown structure